The 2012–13 Bermudian Premier Division is the 50th season of the highest competitive football league in Bermuda, which was founded in 1963.

Overview
The competition started in October 2012 and finished in March 2013. Dandy Town Hornets were the defending champions, having won their sixth league championship the season before.

Devonshire Cougars won the league title in March 2013 when Somerset Trojans beat Cougars' sole challengers North Village Rams to pull Rams out of the title race. Robin Hood and St. George’s Colts were relegated.

Teams

League  table

Top scorers

References

Bermudian Premier Division seasons
Bermuda
1